Al-Johani, Al-Juhani or Al-Jehani is a surname. Notable people with the surname include:

Al-Johani 
 Abdulrahman Al-Johani (born 1988), Saudi Arabian handball player
 Khaled al-Johani (born 1971), teacher of religious instruction in Riyadh, Saudi Arabia 
 Mazen Al-Johani (born 1995), Saudi Arabian footballer
 Raed Al-Johani (born 1987), Saudi football player
 Sultan Al-Johani (born 1992), Saudi footballer
 Ziyad Al-Johani (born 2001), Saudi Arabian footballer

Al-Juhani 
 Abdullah Awad Al Juhany (born 1976), Saudi Arabian imam
 Khalid al-Juhani (died 2003), Saudi Arabian al-Qaeda member
 Laila al-Juhani (born 1969), Saudi Arabian novelist and short story writer
 Ma'bad al-Juhani (died 699), 7th-century Arab
 Muhammad al-Juhani (disambiguation), multiple people

Arabic-language surnames
Surnames of Saudi Arabian origin